Tour du Marboré or Tour de Gavarnie is a Pyrenean summit, culminating at , located on the Franco-Spanish border crest in the Monte Perdido Range.

Toponymy 
see: Cilindro de Marboré

Topography 
The Tour du Marboré is part of the range above Cirque de Gavarnie. It marks the border between the Pyrenees National Park of France and the Ordesa y Monte Perdido National Park of Spain.

 On the French side, it is located in the commune of Gavarnie in the canton of Luz-Saint-Sauveur, Hautes-Pyrénées department, Midi-Pyrénées region. 
 On the Spanish side, it is located in the comarca of Sobrarbe, Huesca province, Aragon.

Mountaineering 
In 1956, it was climbed from the northern side by Jean Ravier and Claude Dufourmantelle.

References 

Mountains of the Pyrenees
Mountains of Hautes-Pyrénées
Mountains of Aragon
Pyrenean three-thousanders